Msgr. Božo Milanović (Kringa, October 10, 1890 - Pazin, December 28, 1980 ), was a Croatian priest, theologian and politician from Istria, and, along with Antonio Santino, one of the greatest anti-fascists of Istria. He is credited with decisively contributing to the unification of Istria with Croatia.

Biography
Božo Milanović was born in Kringa in 1890 to Jakov and Ana, in a Croatian peasant family. He attended primary school in his hometown. After five grades of primary school, he enrolled in the first grade of the Croatian classical Imperial-Royal Great State Gymnasium in Pazin. He was ordained a priest on July 7, 1914, in Trieste. He studied theology in Gorizia. He received his doctorate in Vienna in 1919.

During the Italian fascist administration of Istria, he was one of the few who promoted the rights of the non-Italian population, that is the Croatian and Slovene people, who were threatened with assimilation at best, and persecuted at worst.

He had a reputation as a populist.  In the early 1920s, he was in Kringa, where he was repeatedly physically attacked by fascists as a declared Croatian patriot, i.e. an opponent of Italianization; even before the fascists came to power in Italy. In 1922 he was appointed chaplain in Trieste. During the elections for the Italian parliament in 1922, his parish court was set on fire, and Milanović beaten by the Italian fascists (who were not yet in power in Italy, but were already active in Istria). In 1923 he became the president of the Istrian Literary Society of St. Cyril and Methodius in Pazin (then called the Society of St. Mohor) and managed that society for many years; works written by Milanović himself were published by the society. At the end of the 1920s, he lived and worked in Trieste, where he published the last permitted literature and had a prominent role in the Istrian resistance in the joint Slovene-Croatian organization Edinost. At that time of fascism in Istria, Milanović spent part of his time in internment because he printed a Croatian primer with a group of priests and agreed with the pastors to open Croatian schools.

He had the important role as one of the representatives of Istria at the Peace Conference in Paris in 1946, at which the fate of Istria after the war was decided. Data collected by Msgr. Božo Milanović, Zvonimir Brumnić and other Croatian priests were one of the main arguments why Istria belongs to Croatia, (at the time part of Yugoslavia). The borders were agreed by the Paris Peace Agreement in 1947: Trieste went to Italy, Istria passed to Yugoslavia. The main document that was used in Paris by the priests was the Spomenica hrvatskog svećenstva u Istri Savezničkoj komisiji za razgraničenje Julijske krajine. It was brought to Pazin on February 12, 1946. The document was brought there by the Zbor svećenika sv. Pavla za Istru ("Choir of St. Paul's Priests for Istria") and was signed by President Tomo Banko, Secretary Miro Bulešić, councilors Božo Milanović, Leopold Jurca, Josip Pavlišić, Antun Cukarić and Srećko Štifanić, as well as 48 board members. In the document, the priests showed all the horrors that the Croats, including the priests, endured from the Italians from 1918 up to 1943.

In Trieste in 1946, he started the newspaper Gore srca!.

Milanović was the director of the seminary gymnasium of Pazin from 1947 to 1968; and the director of the Theological College in Pazin from 1955 to 1965.

In 1962, he received an honorary doctorate in theology from the University of Zagreb.

After Istria passed to Yugoslavia, many (Croatian) Istrian populists (such as Mate Peteh), as well as priests, were targeted by the Yugoslavian authorities. Priest Miroslav Bulešić was brutally killed, and to this day the body of the priest Francesco Bonifacio has not been found. Božo Milanović himself was called an enemy of the state.

Bibliography
 Istria in the dawn of the national revival: 1797-1860, book, Pazin, 1960.
 Cosmology, book, Pazin, 1967.
 Croatian National Revival in Istria, vol. 1: 1797 - 1882, Pazin, 1967; book 2: 1883 - 1947, Pazin, 1973 (2nd ed. Book 1: (1797 - 1882), Pazin, 1991)
 Metaphysical psychology, book, Pazin, 1968.
 Ethics, book (3rd ed. Pazin, 1968)
 Ontology, book, Pazin, 1969.
 History of Philosophy, book, Pazin, 1970.
 Teodiceja, book, Pazin, 1970.
 Revivalist of Istria, Bishop Dr. Juraj Dobrila, Pazin, 1970
 Experimental Psychology, book (3rd ed. Pazin, 1964, 4th ed. Pazin, 1971)
 Our Father, prayer book, Pazin, 1974.
 My memories: (1900-1976), book, Pazin, 1976.
 Istria in the 20th century: notes and reflections on the time lived, vol. 1: Under Austria and Italy, Pazin, 1992; book 2: War and Liberation, Pazin, 1996.
 Croatian border in northwestern Istria, article, Nova Istra 18 (2013), 1/2 (47); p. 284–286.

Sources
 Stipan Trogrlić, From the "People's Enemy" to a Respectable Interlocutor, Glas Koncila, January 2, 2011, p. 21., sublist diplomatic struggle Msgr. Božo Milanović for Croatian Istria (1)
 Maja Polić, Scientific Conference Mons. Dr. Božo Milanović - traces of a vision, Pazin, 2010. // Rijeka, sv. 16, no. March 1, 2011, p. 87-89, (Hamster)
 Stipan Trogrlić, The Istrian Croatian Clergy and the Diplomatic-Political Struggle for the Unification of Istria with Croatia (1945–1954) // Društvena istraživanja, sv. 21, no. 2 (116). April 2012, p. 485-504, (Hamster)
 Jasna Ćurković Nimac, Stipe Tadić and Stipan Trogrlić, Božo Milanović and the ethical implications of his political activity // Nova prisnostnost: časopis za intelektualna i duhovna pitanja'', sv. XI, no. 3. November 2013, p. 349–364, (Hrčak)

References

1890 births
1920 deaths
People from Istria
20th-century Croatian historians
20th-century Croatian Roman Catholic priests